(1548–1635) was the 16th hereditary chieftain of the Sōma clan and a Sengoku period daimyō with territories covering the three districts forming the northern Hamadōri region of southern Mutsu Province.

Biography
Yoshitane was the eldest son of Sōma Moritane, the 15th chieftain of the Sōma clan. At the time, the clan was based at Odaka Castle. In 1559, the clan was approached by Date Tanemune and was offered a matrimonial alliance. Yoshitane was wed to Tanemune's younger daughter, Kosugō Gozen the following year. However, following the death of Tanemune in 1565, the ancient enmity between the Sōma and Date clans flared up again in a border dispute, and Yoshitane divorced Kosugō Gozen and sent her back to the Date clan.

Yoshitane fought the Date clan many times, as the Date invaded his domain on 30 occasions. Both Sōma Yoshitane and Date Masamune submitted to Toyotomi Hideyoshi at the Siege of Odawara.

At the time of the Battle of Sekigahara, the Sōma attempted to remain neutral for fear of the powerful Satake clan to the south, which was allied with Ishida Mitsunari through marriage ties. The new Tokugawa shogunate initially decided to seize the Sōma territories, but through the intervention of several senior retainers (including their former arch-enemy Date Masamune), the shogunate relented and appointed Yoshitanes son, Sōma Toshitane as a tozama daimyō over a 60,000 koku Sōma  Nakamura Domain which encompassed their traditional holdings.

Notes

Daimyo
1548 births
1635 deaths